Solanum seaforthianum, the Brazilian nightshade, is a flowering evergreen vine of the family Solanaceae native to tropical South America.  As a member of the Solanum genus, it is related to such plants as the tomato and potato. It is characterized by clusters of four to seven leaves and can climb to a height of  given enough room.  It blooms in the mid to late summer with clusters of star-shaped purple inflorescence followed by scarlet marble-sized berries.  The plant is highly heat resistant, but cannot tolerate frost conditions.  The plant contains modest amounts of various tropane alkaloids such as atropine, scopolamine and hyoscyamine and should be considered mildly toxic and inedible.
Promising molluscicidal and schistosomicidal activities were displayed for the S. seaforthianum extracts and fractions which are attributed to the glycoalkaloid content.

The species has become widely naturalised outside its native range and is an invasive species in Australia, Africa, Indochina, the Pacific Islands and India, choking native vegetation and poisoning livestock.

References

seaforthianum
Plants described in 1808
Taxa named by Henry Cranke Andrews